Herbert Gould Phipps (8 August 1845 – 19 October 1899) was an English first-class cricketer and merchant.

The son of Arthur Constantine Phipps, he was born in August 1845 at Shepton Mallet and was educated at Harrow School, where he played for the cricket and football elevens. He later played first-class cricket for the Marylebone Cricket Club on two occasions in 1865 against the Surrey Club at The Oval and Lord's, scoring 9 runs across both matches. He was by profession a merchant in the British concession of Tientsin in China, where he died in October 1899. His twin brother, Walter, also played first-class cricket.

References

External links

1845 births
1899 deaths
People from Shepton Mallet
People educated at Harrow School
English cricketers
Marylebone Cricket Club cricketers
English merchants
Twin sportspeople